Simone Malusa (born 26 January 1974 in Ivrea) is an Italian snowboarder. He competed in the men's snowboard cross event in the 2006 Winter Olympics, placing 33rd, and the 2010 Winter Olympics, placing 30th.

References

1974 births
Living people
Italian male snowboarders
Olympic snowboarders of Italy
Snowboarders at the 2006 Winter Olympics
Snowboarders at the 2010 Winter Olympics
21st-century Italian people